This is a list of notable Armenians.

Historical 

 List of Armenian monarchs

By country
Americas
 List of Armenian Americans
 List of Armenian Canadians

Caucasus
 List of Azerbaijani Armenians
 List of Armenians from Nagorno-Karabakh

Europe
 List of French Armenians
 List of Greek Armenians
 List of Armenians in the United Kingdom
 List of Romanians of Armenian descent
 List of Russian Armenians

Middle East
 List of Egyptian Armenians
 List of Iranian Armenians
 List of Iraqi Armenians
 List of Lebanese Armenians
 List of Ottoman Armenians
 List of Syrian Armenians
 List of Turkish Armenians

By occupation

Ambassadors 
List of ambassadors of Armenia

Art
 List of Armenian architects
 List of Armenian artists
 List of Armenian women artists

Business
 List of Armenian businesspeople

Chefs
George Duran, American chef
Geoffrey Zakarian, Iron Chef America

Entertainers
 Davit Gharibyan (born 1990), media personality, actor, director, producer, tv host, model and social media influencer
 Ed Alberian (1920–1997), children's television actor and entertainer
 Charla Baklayan Faddoul, Amazing Race season 5 contestant
 Cher (born 1946), singer and actress
 Pierre Chammassian, comedian
 George Duran (born 1975), entertainer
 Leslie Erganian, artist and television personality
 Tina Kandelaki, Russian television personality
 Khloé Kardashian (born 1984), television personality, socialite, actress, businesswoman, designer, model and social media influencer
 Kim Kardashian (born 1980), television personality, socialite, actress, businesswoman, model and social media influencer
 Kourtney Kardashian (born 1979), television personality, socialite, model and social media influencer
 Robert Kardashian (1944–2003), American attorney and businessman
 Bob Kevoian (born 1950), co-host of the Bob & Tom Show
 Vilen Kolouta (1930–1999), cinematographer
 Tigran Khzmalyan (aka Xmalian) (born 1963), filmmaker, screenwriter and producer
 Henrik Malyan (1925–1988), film writer and director
 Rouben Mamoulian (1897–1987), film and theater director
 Andre Manoukian (born 1957), composer in France
 Garik Martirosyan (born 1974), TV host and comedian
 Patrick Masbourian (born 1970), Canadian television personality
 Michael Omartian (born 1945), music producer of Donna Summer
 Kev Orkian (born 1974), actor, musician and comedian
 Richard Ouzounian (born 1950), Armenian by adoption; playwright, director, critic, artistic director
 Alice Panikian (born 1985), 2006 Miss Universe Canada
 Sergei Parajanov (1924–1990), filmmaker
 Yevgeny Petrosyan (born 1945), comedian
 Karen Shakhnazarov (born 1952), filmmaker, producer and head of the Mosfilm studios
 Jano Toussounian, Australian/Armenian actor
 Mikhail Vartanov (1937–2009), filmmaker
 Henri Verneuil (1920–2002), filmmaker
 Steven Zaillian (born 1953), screenwriter, producer

Actors
 List of Armenian actors

Businessmen

 Calouste Sarkis Gulbenkian (1869–1955), businessman and philanthropist

Directors
 List of Armenian film directors

Musicians

 Anahid Ajemian (1924–2016), violinist
 Maro Ajemian (1921–1978), pianist
 Lucine Amara (born 1927), Lucine Tockqui Armaganian, soprano
 Levon Ambartsumian (born 1955), classical violinist
 Armen Anassian, violinist
 Armenchik (born 1980), pop singer
 André (born 1979), pop singer
 Anoushka (born 1960), Egyptian-Armenian singer
 Nareh Arghamanyan (born 1989), pianist
 Rosy Armen, French singer
 Raffi Armenian (born 1942), Armenian-Canadian conductor, pianist, composer, and teacher
 Inga and Anush Arshakyans, singers
 Marc Aryan (1926–1985), French/Belgian singer, composer, producer
 Şahan Arzruni (born 1943), pianist
 Aram Asatryan (1953–2006), pop singer
 George Avakian (1919–2017), jazz producer
 Charles Aznavour (1924–2018), French singer-songwriter, actor
 Ross Bagdasarian, Sr. (1919–1972), better known as "David Seville", creator of Alvin and the Chipmunks
 Ross Bagdasarian, Jr. (born 1949), American, continues the work of his father on  Alvin and the Chipmunks
 Clint Bajakian, composer of video game music
 Ani Batikian (born 1982), Armenian violinist living in the UK
 Isabel Bayrakdarian (born 1974), Canadian soprano and engineer
 Ara Berberian (1930–2005), opera singer
 Cathy Berberian (1925–1983), mezzo-soprano singer
 Boka (1949–2020), singer
 Julian Byzantine, guitarist
 Crimesterdam
 John Dolmayan (born 1973), Lebanese-born Armenian-American songwriter and drummer
 Stéphan Elmas (1862–1937), composer, pianist
 Ivan Galamian (1903–1981), violinist
 Sergio Galoyan (born 1981), record producer and songwriter
 Djivan Gasparyan (1928–2021), musician, composer
 Gohar Gasparyan (1924–2007), Armenian opera singer
 Slava Grigoryan (born 1976), guitar virtuoso
 J. Michael Hagopian, drummer of Deli Creeps
 Richard Hagopian (born 1937), musician
 Ruben Hakhverdyan, musician, songwriter
 Silva Hakobyan, Armenian singer
 Tigran Hamasyan (born 1987), jazz pianist
 Sirusho Harutyunyan (born 1987 as Siranush Harutyunyan), Armenian pop and classical singer
 Hayko (1973–2021), singer
 Vatche Hovsepian
 Levon Ichkhanian (born 1964), guitarist/multi-instrumentalist
 Jamala (born 1983), Ukrainian singer and composer of Crimean Tatar descent, winner of the Eurovision Song Contest 2016
 Hasmik Karapetyan (born 1977), pop singer
 Anna Kasyan, opera singer, soprano
 Udi Hrant Kenkulian (1901–1978), musician
 Aram Khachaturian (1903–1978), composer
 Sergey Khachatryan (born 1985), youngest violinist winner of Sibelius competition;  2005 winner of Queen Elizabeth competition
 Philipp Kirkorov (born 1967), Russian pop singer
 Hampartsoum Limondjian (1768–1839), composer of Armenian church music and Turkish classical music, developed the Hampartsoum notation system
 Pavel Lisitsian (1911–2004), Russian opera singer
 Andranik Madadian (born 1956), singer
 Daron Malakian (born 1975), American singer-songwriter, multi-instrumentalist, and record producer
 Norayr Mnatsakanyan (1923–1986), Armenian national singer
 Armen Movsessian, violinist
 Kacey Musgraves, American country music singer-songwriter
 Armen Nalbandian (born 1978), pianist, composer
 Maria Nalbandian (born 1983), Lebanese singer
 Bruce Nazarian (1949–2015), musician, recording artist, producer
 Sayat Nova (Harutin) (1712–1795), Armenian-Georgian folk songwriter-musician
 Shavo Odadjian (born 1974), Armenian American songwriter, multi-instrumentalist, music video director/editor, music producer, and artist/painter
 Bulat Okudzhava (1924–1997), Armenian-Georgian musician, poet and editor
 Kev Orkian (born 1974), actor, musician and comedian
 Harout Pamboukjian (born 1950), Armenian singer-songwriter
 Hasmik Papian (born 1961), soprano
 Karina Pasian (born 1991), Grammy-nominated singer and pianist
 Christine Pepelyan (born 1980), pop singer
 Krzysztof Penderecki (1933–2020), Polish composer and conductor of classical music
 Lilit Pipoyan (born 1955), musician, singer and architect
 Raffi (born Raffi Cavoukian, 1948), Canadian children's singer-songwriter, musician
 Leon Redbone (né Dickran Golbalian) (1949–2019), jazz and blues artist
 Eva Rivas (born 1987), Armenian pop singer, model
 Gevorg Sargsyan (born 1981), opera-symphonic conductor
 Karnig Sarkissian, singer of Armenian revolutionary songs
 Hélène Ségara (born 1971), French singer
 Nariné Simonian, Armenian-French pianist, organist, opera musical director
 Tata Simonyan (born 1962), pop singer
 Stephanie (born 1987), Japanese singer
 Serj Tankian (born 1967), Armenian American singer-songwriter, composer, multi-instrumentalist, record producer, poet, and political activist
 Harry Tavitian (born 1952), jazz musician
 Jean Ter-Merguerian (1935–2015), Armenian-French violinist and pedagogue
 Aram Tigran (1934–2009), Kurdish singer
 Onno Tunç (1948–1996), born Ohannes Tunçboyacıyan, Turkish-Armenian musician, composer
 Arto Tunçboyacıyan (born 1957), percussionist and singer
 George Tutunjian (died 2006), pioneering Armenian revolutionary songs performer
 Vartan Vahramian (born 1955) Iran, musician, painter
 Komitas Vardapet (1896–1935), musician
 Sylvie Vartan (born 1944), French singer
 Karapetê Xaço (1900–2005), Kurdish singer
 Samvel Yervinyan (born 1966), violinist
 Nune Yesayan (born 1969), pop musician

Producers
 Davit Gharibyan, producer of Ari Parenq TV series, Happy International Women's Day and We Remember and Demand 106 social videos.
 Howard Kazanjian, producer of Star Wars
 Sev Ohanian, producer of Searching, Fruitvale Station and the upcoming Space Jam: A New Legacy
 Natalie Qasabian, producer of Searching and Run
 Katherine Sarafian, producer at Pixar
 Alain Terzian, French producer, President of Association of French Producers

Journalists

 Kevork Ajemian (1932–1998), prominent Armenian writer, journalist, novelist, theorist and public activist, one of the founders of the ASALA military organization
 Nubar Alexanian (born 1950), photojournalist, documentary photographer, and film director
 Ben Bagdikian (1920–2016), former editor-in-chief of The Washington Post
 John Roy Carlson (1909–1991), best-selling author of Under Cover
 Hrant Dink (1954–2007), executive editor of Turkish-Armenian newspaper Agos
 George Donikian, news anchor in Australia
 John Garabedian, radio host
 Bedros Hadjian, writer, journalist and educator
 David Ignatius (born 1950), associate editor of the Washington Post
 Armen Keteyian (born 1953), reporter
 Tim Kurkjian (born 1956), analyst at ESPN
 Hrand Nazariantz (1880–1962), lived in Italy, Nobel Prize candidate
 Lara Setrakian, journalist and political analyst for Bloomberg Television and ABC News
 Janet Shamlian, NBC News correspondent
 Margarita Simonyan, editor-in-chief of RT (Russia Today)
 Roger Tatarian (1917–1995), senior VP of United Press International
 Philip Terzian (born 1950), editor at the Weekly Standard
 Matt Vasgersian (born 1967), sportscaster

Military
Middle Ages

 Vassak Mamikonian (d. 368), Sparapet
 Vardan Mamikonian (d. 451), Sparapet
 Narses (478–573), one of Byzantine Emperor Justinian I's generals in the Roman reconquest
 Gregory Pakourianos (d. 1086), Byzantine general
 Philaretos Brachamios (d. 1087), general, usurper of the Byzantine Empire

Early modern period
 John III the Terrible (1572–1574), Voivode of Moldavia
 David Bek (d. 1728), military commander in Syunik
 Mkhitar Sparapet (d. 1730), military commander in Syunik

Russian Empire
 Valerian Madatov (1782–1829), general
 Mikhail Lazarev (1788–1851), fleet commander and explorer
 Lazar Serebryakov (1795–1862), admiral
 Ivan Lazarev (1820–1879), Lieutenant General
 Arshak Ter-Gukasov (1819–1881), Lieutenant General
 Mikhail Loris-Melikov (1825–1888), General of the Cavalry, Russian Minister of Interior 
 Tovmas Nazarbekian (1855–1931), Russian and later Armenian general
 Daniel Bek-Pirumyan (1861–1921)
 Movses Silikyan (1862–1937)
 Christophor Araratov (1876–1937)

Armenian national liberation movement, First Republic of Armenia
 Serob Aghpur, fedayee
 Andranik, fedayee
 Arabo, fedayee
 Kevork Chavush, fedayee
 Drastamat Kanayan
 Aram Manukian
 Sebastatsi Murad, fedayee
 Garegin Nzhdeh
 Ruben Ter-Minasian

Soviet period
Hayk Bzhishkyan (1887–1937), Comcor (Commander of the Corps)
Sergei Khudyakov (1902–1950), Marshal of Aviation
Ivan Isakov (1894–1967), Admiral of the Fleet of the Soviet Union
Hamazasp Babadzhanian (1906–1977), Chief Marshal of the Armored Forces
Ivan Bagramyan (1897–1982), Marshal of the Soviet Union
Sergey Aganov (1917–1996), Marshal of Engineer Troops

United States 
 Paul Ignatius (born 1920), Secretary of the Navy
Jeffrey L. Harrigian (born 1962), United States Air Force General, commander of U.S. Air Forces in Europe and U.S. Air Forces Africa

First Nagorno-Karabakh War

Simon Achikgyozyan
Samvel Babayan
Gurgen Dalibaltayan, colonel-general
Garo Kahkejian
Tatul Krpeyan
 Mikael Harutyunyan (born 1946), 7th Defence Minister
Monte Melkonian
Seyran Ohanyan (born 1962), Minister of Defence of the Republic of Armenia
Vazgen Sargsyan
Sedrak Saroyan
Vardan Stepanyan
Norat Ter-Grigoryants
Arkady Ter-Tadevosyan

Monarchs
 List of Armenian kings
 List of Armenian consorts
 List of monarchs of the Armenian Kingdom of Cilicia
 List of rulers of Commagene

Politicians

Nubar Pasha, Prime Minister of Egypt (1878–1879, 1884–1888, 1894–1895)
Mikhail Loris-Melikov, Minister of Interior of the Russian Empire (1880–1881) 
Stepan Shahumyan, Head of the Baku Commune (1918)
Aleksandr Myasnikyan, Head of the Communist Party of Belarus (1918–1919)
Levon Mirzoyan, first Secretary of the Communist Party of Azerbaijan (1926–1929)
Ferenc Szálasi, fascist Leader of the Nation of Hungary (1944–1945) 
Anastas Mikoyan, first Deputy Chairman of the Council of Ministers of the Soviet Union (1955–1964)
George Deukmejian, Governor of California (1983–1991)
Édouard Balladur, Prime Minister of France (1993–1995)
Boris Şyhmyradow, Minister of Foreign Affairs of Turkmenistan (1995–2000)
Émile Lahoud, President of Lebanon (1998–2007)
Karim Pakradouni, Minister of State for Administrative Development of Lebanon (2004–2005)
Zurab Zhvania, Prime Minister of Georgia (2004–2005)
Sergey Lavrov, Minister of Foreign Affairs of Russia (2004–)
Varujan Vosganian, Minister of Economy and Finance of Romania (2007–2008, 2012–)
Patrick Devedjian, French Minister for the Implementation of the Recovery Plan (2008–2010)
Liliam Kechichián, Uruguay Minister of Tourism (2012–)
Joe Hockey, Treasurer of Australia (2013–2015)
Arsen Avakov, Minister of Internal Affairs of Ukraine (2014–)
Gladys Berejiklian, 45th Premier of New South Wales, Australia (2017–)

Religious leaders
 Saint Blaise
 Saint Servatius
 List of Catholicoi of Armenia
 List of Armenian Catholicoi of Cilicia
 List of Armenian Catholic Patriarchs of Cilicia
 List of Armenian Patriarchs of Constantinople
 List of Armenian Patriarchs of Jerusalem
 Demos Shakarian, founder of the Full Gospel Business Men's Fellowship International
 Yaqub Abcarius, bishop
 Photios I of Constantinople, orthodox patriarch, a central figure in Christianization of Kievan Rus'

Science

 Evgeny Aramovich Abramyan, founder of several research directions in the Soviet and Russian nuclear technology
 Daron Acemoglu, among the 20 most cited economists in the world, winner of the 2005 John Bates Clark Medal
 Hovannes Adamian, engineer, inventor of color television
 Sergei Adian, mathematician, head of the department of Mathematical Logic of the Steklov Institute of Mathematics
 George Adomian, mathematician, developer of Adomian decomposition method
 Tateos Agekian, astrophysicist, one of the pioneers of Stellar Dynamics
 Hagop S. Akiskal, psychiatrist best known for his pioneering research on temperament and bipolar disorder (manic depression)
 Armen Alchian, economist, one of the major economists of the 20th century
 Artem Alikhanian, nuclear physicist, one of the founders and first director of the Yerevan Physics Institute (YerPhI)
 Sos Alikhanian, geneticist, one of the founders of molecular genetics in the USSR, founder of the State Research Institute of Genetics (GosNIIgenetika)
 Sarkis Acopian, designer of the first ever solar radio
 Abram Alikhanov, nuclear physicist, one of the founders of nuclear physics in USSR, founder of the first nuclear reactor of USSR, founder of the Institute for Theoretical and Experimental Physics (ITEP)
 Viktor Ambartsumian, astrophysicist, one of the founders of theoretical astrophysics
 Emil Artin, mathematician, one of the founders of modern algebra
 Michael Artin, mathematician, contributed to algebraic geometry
 Gurgen Askaryan, physicist, inventor of light self focusing
 Lev Atamanov, one of the founders of Soviet animation art
 Vandika Ervandovna Avetisyan, botanist and mycologist
 Boris Babayan, computer scientist, father of supercomputing in the former Soviet Union and Russia, founder of Moscow Center of SPARC Technologies (MCST)
 Mikhail Chailakhyan, founder of hormonal theory of plant development
 Artur Chilingarov, polar explorer
 Giacomo Luigi Ciamician, founder of photochemistry
 Richard Donchian, father of Trend Following Trading, one of the most outstanding figures of all time in the field of commodity money management
 Grigor Gurzadyan, founder of space astronomy
 Spiru Haret, astronomer; made a fundamental contribution to the n-body problem, initially aimed at modelling the planetary motions in our solar system
 Paris Herouni, projected and built the world's first radio-optical telescope
 Bagrat Ioannisiani, constructor of new astronomical instruments, chief designer of BTA-6, the largest telescope in the world
 Andronik Iosifyan, aerospace engineer, chief electrician of Soviet missiles and spacecraft, including the R-7 Semyorka and the Soyuz spacecraft
 Alexander Kemurdzhian, aerospace engineer, designer of the first space exploration rovers for moon and mars
 Edward Keonjian, pioneer of microelectronics, designer of the world's first solar-powered, pocket-sized radio transmitter
 Leonid Khachiyan, mathematician, computer scientist, proved the existence of an efficient way to solve linear programming problems
 Tigran Khudaverdyan, computer scientist, deputy CEO of Yandex
 Semyon Davidovich Kirlian, inventor of Kirlian Photography, discovered that living matter emits energy fields
 Ivan Knunyants, chemist, significantly contributed to the advancement of Soviet chemistry; one of the major developers of Soviet chemical weapons program
 Samvel Kocharyants, nuclear scientist, developer of the first Soviet nuclear warheads for ballistic missiles
 Anna Kazanjian Longobardo, author of contributions to the aerospace engineering field, the first woman to receive the Egleston Medal for Distinguished Engineering achievement
 Ignacy Łukasiewicz, pharmacist, one of the world's pioneers of the oil industry, built the world's first modern oil refinery
 Benjamin Markarian, astrophysicist
 Sergey Mergelyan, mathematician, the author of major contributions in Approximation Theory; head of the department of Complex Analysis of the Steklov Institute of Mathematics
 Artem Mikoyan, aerospace engineer, designer of MiG jet aircraft, including the first supersonic Soviet jet fighter
 Robert Nalbandyan, chemist, co-discoverer of photosynthetic protein plantacyanin, pioneer in the field of free radicals
 Yuri Oganessian, nuclear physicist in the Joint Institute for Nuclear Research (JINR), co-discoverer of the heaviest elements in the periodic table; element Oganesson
 Yuri Osipyan, physicist, author of fundamental contribution to the physics of movements in solid bodies and inventor of photoplastic effect
 Ashot Petrosian, mathematician, computer scientist, contributed to the development of several generations of advanced digital computer systems in former USSR, including the Nairi (computer) and ES EVM
 Mikhail Pogosyan, aerospace engineer, general director of Sukhoi and United Aircraft Corporation (UAC)
 Anna Schchian, botanist
 Georgy Shakhnazarov, one of the founders of political science in USSR
 Luther George Simjian, inventor of ATM and flight simulator 
 Norair Sisakian, biochemist, one of the founders of space biology
 Armen Takhtajan, botanist, one of the most important figures in 20th century plant evolution and systematics and biogeography
 Karen Ter-Martirosian, theoretical physicist, author of fundamental contributions to quantum mechanics and quantum field theory; founder of the Elementary Particle Physics chair of the MIPT
 Alenush Terian, first Iranian-Armenian female astrophysicist
 Avie Tevanian, computer scientist, the architect of Apple's Mac OS X
 Nikolay Yenikolopov, chemist, one of the founders of Russian polymer science

Medicine
 Noubar Afeyan, biochemical engineer, co-founder of the biotechnology company Moderna
 George Aghajanian, physician, neuropharmacologist and pioneer in serotonin receptor research
 Roger Altounyan, asthma researcher, pharmacologist who pioneered use of cromolyn sodium inhalation therapy for asthma
 A. V. Apkarian, pioneer in magnetic resonance spectroscopy research of the brain
 Viken Babikian, cardiovascular researcher
 John Basmajian, leader in Rehabilitation Medicine, father of “EMG Biofeedback”, author of pioneering works in electromyography
 Aram Chobanian, Dean, Boston University School of Medicine, leader in cardiology research
 Raymond Vahan Damadian, inventor of magnetic resonance imaging (MRI), inducted into the National Inventors Hall of Fame
 Ara Darzi, Baron Darzi of Denham, surgeon, pioneer in minimally invasive and robot-assisted surgery
 Ivan Gevorkian, Soviet Armenian surgeon and scientist
 Edgar Housepian, neurosurgeon and professor
 Moses M. Housepian, physician and relief worker
 Robert Istepanian, Professor of Data Communication, coined the phrase "m-health"
 Albert Kapikian, virologist and pioneer in vaccine development for rotavirus
 Varaztad Kazanjian, pioneer of plastic surgery
 J. W. Kebabian, neuroscientist and pioneer in dopamine receptor research
 Hampar Kelikian, orthopedic-surgeon pioneer,  extended the surgical field
 Jack Kevorkian, pathologist, euthanasia activist
 Edward Khantzian, Harvard psychiatrist; developed self-medication hypothesis of substance abuse
 Zaven Khatchaturian, neuroscientist, Alzheimer's disease researcher
 John Najarian, developed the practice of organ transplantation
 Leon Orbeli (1882–1958), physiologist, pioneer of evolutionary physiology
 Ardem Patapoutian, molecular biologist and neuroscientist, won the Nobel Prize for Medicine in 2021
 Hrayr Shahinian, pioneer in microsurgical techniques of the brain
 Michel Ter-Pogossian, inventor of positron emission tomography (PET)

Economists
 Daron Acemoglu
 Armen Alchian, economist
 Arman Manukyan
 Lee Ohanian, macroeconomist

Sports

 Arthur Abraham, professional boxer
 Andre Agassi, tennis player
 Levon Aronian, chess player
 Zach Bogosian, ice hockey player
 Robert Emmiyan, long jumper
 Garry Kasparov, world chess champion
 Henrikh Mkhitaryan, football player
 Levon Pashabezyan, taekwondo athlete
 Tigran Petrosian, world chess champion
 Alain Prost, Formula One racer
 Nikita Simonyan, football player
 Yurik Vardanyan, weightlifter
 List of Armenian boxers
 List of Armenian chess players
 List of Armenian footballers
 List of Armenian Olympic medalists
 List of Armenian wrestlers

Writers

 Narine Abgaryan (born 1971)
 Khachatur Abovian (1805–1842)
 Nicholas Adontz (1871–1942), historian and philologist
 Vittoria Aganoor (1855–1910), poet
 Ghazaros Aghayan (1840–1911)
 Michael Arlen (1895–1956), novelist
 Artine Artinian (1907–2005), literature scholar
 Gheorghe Asachi (1788–1869), writer, poet, historian, painter
 Louise Aslanian (1906–1945), writer, poet, French Resistance fighter, Communist
 Atrpet (1860–1937)
 Axel Bakunts (1889–1937)
 Peter Balakian (born 1951), memoirist and Pulitzer Prize-winning poet
 Ara Baliozian (1936–2019)
 David Barsamian, writer, radio host
 A. I. Bezzerides (1908–2007), screenwriter and novelist
 Chris Bohjalian
 Gary Braver
 Michael Casey (born 1947), poet
 James Der Derian, international relations researcher and author
 Diana Der Hovanessian (1934–2018), poet 
 Gabriel El-Registan (1899–1945), poet, co-author of the anthem of the USSR
 Gevorg Emin (1918–1998), poet, essayist, and translator
 Gregory of Narek (Krikor Naregatsi) (951–1003), religious poet
 Arto Der Haroutunian (1940–1987)
 Artem Harutyunyan (born 1945), writer, translator, critic
 Zbigniew Herbert (1924–1998), Polish poet
 Marjorie Housepian Dobkin, novelist and writer on the Armenian genocide
 Garabet Ibrăileanu (1871–1936), writer, literary critic, professor
 Avetik Isahakyan (1885–1957), poet
 Tadeusz Isakowicz-Zaleski (born 1956), Polish Armenian-Catholic priest and author
 Silva Kaputikyan (1919–2006), poet
 Martiros Kavoukjian (1908–1988), Armenologist
 Nancy Kricorian, writer, activist
 Jan Lechoń (1899–1956), (Leszek Józef Serafinowicz), Polish poet
 M. M. Mangasarian (1859–1943)
 Zara Mgoyan (born 1983), writer, singer
Bethany Mooradian (born 1975), writer
 Moses of Chorene (410–490), father of Armenian historiography
 Alexander Movsesyan, playwright and novelist
 Claude Mutafian (born 1942), historian and mathematician
 Santiago Nazarian (born 1977), novelist
 Hrand Nazariantz (1886–1962), poet and journalist
 Sev Ohanian (born 1987), screenwriter
 Joseph Orbeli (1887–1961), Orientalist
 George Ouzounian (known as "Maddox") (born 1978), author, satirist and webmaster
 Ruben Papian (born 1962), esotericist, para-scientist specializing in subjects such as metaphysics and parapsychology
 Vartan Pasha, Ottoman Armenian statesman, writer and journalist
 Marine Petrossian (born 1960), Armenian poet, essayist and columnist
 Raffi (Hagop Hagopian) (1835–1888), novelist and poet
 Rousas Rushdoony (1916–2001), Calvinistic philosopher and Christian Reconstructionist 
 Aram Saroyan (born 1943), poet, novelist
 William Saroyan (1908–1981), short story writer, novelist, playwright, essayist and memoirist
 Sayat-Nova (1712–1795), philosopher and poet
 Paruyr Sevak (1924–1971), poet
 Marietta Shaginyan (1888–1982)
 Smbat Shahaziz (1840–1908)
 Levon Shant (1869–1951), playwright, novelist
 Hovhannes Shiraz (1915–1984), poet
 Siamanto (1878–1915), poet and martyr
 Juliusz Słowacki (1809–1849,) Polish poet
 George Stambolian (1937–1991), key figure in the early gay literary movement in New York
 Szymon Szymonowic (1558–1629), Polish Renaissance poet
 Serj Tankian (born 1967), singer, songwriter
 Vahan Tekeyan (1878–1948)
 Henri Troyat (born Levon Aslan Torossian) (1911–2007)
 Hovhannes Tumanyan (1869–1923)
 Varand (born 1954), poet, writer, translator, painter, professor
 Alexander Varbedian (born 1943), Armenologist and ethnologist
 Francis Veber (born 1937), screenwriter
 Thomas Woods (born 1972), author and scholar
 Zabel Yesayan (1878–1943), author and human rights activist
 Perch Zeytuntsyan (born 1938–2017), novelist, playwright, screenwriter, and Minister of Culture of Armenia 1990–1991
 Orontes I Sakavakyats (570–560 BC)
 Tigranes Orontid (560–535 BC)
 Vahagn (530–515 BC)
 Hidarnes I (late 6th century BC)
 Hidarnes II (early 5th century BC)
 Hidarnes III (middle of 5th century BC)
Sames I (260 BC)
Arsames I (260 BC–228 BC)
Xerxes (228 BC–212 BC)
Zariadres (212 BC–128 BC)
 Artaxias I (190–159 BC)
 Tigranes I (159–123 BC)
 Artavasdes I (123–95 BC)
 Tigranes the Great (Tigranes II, 95–55 BC)
Tigranes the Younger (65 BC)
 Artavasdes II (55–34 BC)
 Artaxias II (33–20 BC)
 Tigranes III (20–10 BC)
 Tigranes IV with Erato (10–2 BC)
 Ariobarzanes (2 BC–4 AD)
 Artavasdes III (4–6 AD)
 Tigranes V then ruled with Erato (6–12 AD)
 Arsaces I of Armenia (35)
 Orodes of Armenia (37–42)
 Mithridates of Armenia (again) (42–51)
 Tiridates I (52–58, 62–66, officially 66–88)
 Tigranes VI (59–62)
 Sanatruces (Sanatruk) (88–110)
 Axidares (Ashkhadar) (110–113) (foreign Parthian rule)
 Parthamasiris (Partamasir) (113–114) (foreign Parthian rule)
 Vologases I (Vagharsh I) (117/8–144)
 Sohaemus (144–161, (164–186)
 Bakur (161–164)
 Vologases II (Vagharsh II) (186–198)
 Khosrov I (198–217)
 Tiridates II (217–252)
 Khosrov II (c. 252)
 Tiridates III (287–330)
 Khosrov III (330–339)
 Tigranes VII (Tiran) (339–c. 350)
 Arsaces II (Arshak II) (c. 350–368)
 Paps (Pap) (370–374)
 Varasdates (Varazdat) (374–378)
 Arsaces III (Arshak III) (378–387)
 Vologases III (Vagharsh III) (378–386)
 Khosrov IV (387–389)
 Vramshapuh (389–414)
 Artaxias IV (Artashir IV) (422–428)
 Mjej II Gnuni (628–635)
 David Saharuni (635–638)
 Theodore Rshtuni (638–645)
 Varaztirots II Bagratuni (645)
 Theodore Rshtuni (645–653, (654–655)
 Mushegh II Mamikonian (654)
 Hamazasp II Mamikonian (655–658)
 Gregory I Mamikonian (662–684/85)
 Ashot II Bagratuni (686–690)
 Nerses Kamsarakan (689–691)
 Smbat VI Bagratuni (691–711)
 Ashot III Bagratuni (732–748)
 Gregory II Mamikonian (748–750)
 Sahak VII Bagratuni (755–761)
 Smbat VII Bagratuni (761–775)
 Ashot IV Bagratuni (806–826)
 Leo V the Armenian (813–820) (Byzatine Emperor)
Constantine (son of Leo V) (813–830) (Byzatine Emperor)
 Bagrat II Bagratuni (830–851)
 Ashot V Bagratuni (862–884)
 Ashot I of Armenia (884–890)
 Smbat I of Armenia (890–914)
Gagik I Artsruni (904–937)
 Ashot II of Armenia (914–926)
 Abas I of Armenia (928–953)
Derenik-Ashot of Vaspurakan (937–953)
Abusahl-Hamazasp of Vaspurakan (953–972)
 Ashot III of Armenia (953–977)
Ashot-Sahak of Vaspurakan (972–983)
Smbat II of Armenia (977–989)
Gagik I of Armenia (989–1020)
Gurgen-Khachik of Vaspurakan (991–1003)
Senekerim-Hovhannes Artsruni (1003–1021)
Hovhannes-Smbat III of Armenia (1020–1040)
Gagik II of Armenia (1042–1045)
 Roupen I (1080/1081/1082–1095)
 Constantine I (1095–1100/1102/1103)
 Thoros I (1100/1102/1103–1129/1130)
 Constantine II (1129/1130)
 Leo I (1129/1130–1137)
 Thoros II (1144/1145–1169)
 Roupen II (1169–1170)
 Mleh (1170–1175)
 Roupen III (1175–1187)
 Leo II (1187–1198/1199)
 Leo I (1198/1199 1219)
 Isabella (1219–1252)
 Shajar al-Durr (1250) (Mamluk Sultan)
 Basil I the Macedonian (Βασίλειος Α') (811–886, ruled 867–886), married the Varangian Eudokia Ingerina
 Leo V the Armenian (775–820, ruled 813–820), married to Theodosia
 Leo VI the Wise (Λέων ΣΤ') (866–912, ruled 886–912)
 Alexander (Αλέξανδρος) (870–913, ruled 912–913), son of Basil I, regent for nephew
 Constantine VII the Purple-born (Κωνσταντίνος Ζ') (905–959, ruled 913–959)
 Romanos I Lekapenos (Ρωμανός Β') (870–948, ruled 919–944), co-emperor, attempted to found his own dynasty; deposed by his sons and entered monastery
 Romanos II the Purple-born (Ρωμανός Β') (938–963, ruled 959–963), son of Constantine VII
 John I Tzimiskes (Ιωάννης Α') (925–976, ruled 969–976), general, brother-in-law of Romanos II, regent for Basil II and Constantine VIII
 Basil II (Βασίλειος Β') the Bulgar-slayer (958–1025, ruled 976–1025)
 Constantine VIII (Κωνσταντίνος Η') (960–1028, ruled 1025–1028), son of Romanos II; silent co-emperor with Basil II, sole emperor after his brother's death
 Zoe Porphyrogenita (Ζωή Α') (c. 978–1050, ruled 1028–1050)
 Theodora (Θεοδώρα) (980–1056, ruled 1042)
 Theodora (Θεοδώρα) (ruled 1055–1056), restored

Fictional
 Petra Arkanian, secondary character in Orson Scott Card's novel Ender's Game and a primary character in subsequent sequels such as Shadow of the Hegemon
 Dona Armênia (Arakel Tchobanian Giovani), character in the Brazilian telenovela Rainha da Sucata played by actress Aracy Balabanian, of Armenian descent herself
 Dany Devedjian, character in the French criminal drama Les Lyonnais
 Margos Dezerian, hit man for the Mob on The Shield
 Vrej Esphanian, galley slave, Armenian trader in Neal Stephenson's The Baroque Cycle
 Rabo Karabekian, protagonist of Kurt Vonnegut's 1987 book Bluebeard
 Max Kerkerian, character in Les rivières pourpres,  detective inspector, starring Vincent Cassel
 Vin Makazian, detective in the TV series The Sopranos, played by John Heard
 Melik Nachararyan, character in the novel Ali and Nino
 Camille Saroyan, character in the TV Series Bones
 Armin Tamzarian, Simpsons character better known as Principal Seymour Skinner

References